Cristian Marcelo González Tassano (born 23 July 1996) is an Uruguayan footballer who plays as a central defender for Russian club Khimki.

Club career
Born in Montevideo, González joined Danubio's youth setup in December 2010, from C.A. Peñarol de AUFI. He made his first team debut on 7 March 2015, starting in a 0–0 home draw against Montevideo Wanderers.

González first appeared in Copa Libertadores on 18 March 2015, playing the full 90 minutes in a 1–2 home loss against Corinthians. He became a regular starter for the side during the 2014–15 campaign, contributing with 22 appearances.

On 23 August 2016, González signed a four-year contract with Sevilla FC, being assigned to the reserves in Segunda División. He made his debut for the club three days later, coming on as a substitute for compatriot Andrés Schetino in a 1–1 away draw against CD Tenerife.

González scored his first senior goal on 13 November 2016, netting the game's only in a home success over UD Almería. On 15 August 2018, after suffering relegation, he was loaned to Eredivisie side FC Twente for one year.

On 14 August 2019, González returned to Spain and its second division, after agreeing to a one-year loan deal with CD Mirandés. Nevertheless, in January 2020 he returned to Sevilla. On 27 January 2020, he then moved to Argentine club Rosario Central on one-year loan deal.

After only two games for Rosario, González terminated his agreement with Rosario and travelled to Portugal to sign with C.D. Santa Clara. The deal with Santa Clara was confirmed on 5 October 2020.

On 10 February 2023, González signed a two-year contract with Russian Premier League club Khimki.

Personal life
González Tassano was registered by the Russian Premier League as a citizen of Italy.

Honours

Club

Twente
Eerste Divisie: 2018–19

References

External links
 
 
 

1996 births
Footballers from Montevideo
Living people
Uruguayan footballers
Uruguay under-20 international footballers
Association football defenders
Danubio F.C. players
Sevilla Atlético players
FC Twente players
CD Mirandés footballers
Rosario Central footballers
C.D. Santa Clara players
FC Khimki players
Uruguayan Primera División players
Segunda División players
Eerste Divisie players
Argentine Primera División players
Primeira Liga players
Russian Premier League players
Uruguayan expatriate footballers
Expatriate footballers in Spain
Uruguayan expatriate sportspeople in Spain
Expatriate footballers in the Netherlands
Uruguayan expatriate sportspeople in the Netherlands
Expatriate footballers in Argentina
Uruguayan expatriate sportspeople in Argentina
Expatriate footballers in Portugal
Uruguayan expatriate sportspeople in Portugal
Expatriate footballers in Russia
Uruguayan expatriate sportspeople in Russia